Christmas is the first Christmas album by the Canadian country music artist Johnny Reid. It was released on November 10, 2009, by MapleMusic Recordings. The album contains nine Christmas classics along with the original songs "Waiting for Christmas to Come" and "Christmas Time Again".

Christmas was certified Gold by the Canadian Recording Industry Association within one day of release.

Track listing

Personnel
Eddie Bayers - drums
Richard Bennett - bouzouki, acoustic guitar, electric guitar
Eric Darken - percussion
Bailey Eleazer - children's choir
Sophie Eleazer - children's choir
Vicki Hampton - background vocals
Tania Hancheroff - background vocals
Jim Hoke - harmonica, mandolin, baritone saxophone, tenor saxophone
John Barlow Jarvis - organ, piano, Wurlitzer
Caylor Lanius - children's choir
Sam Levine - penny whistle
Brent Maher - background vocals
Joy Owings - children's choir
Johnny Reid - lead vocals, background vocals
Mark Selby - acoustic guitar, electric guitar
Glenn Worf - bass guitar

Charts

Weekly charts

Year-end charts

Certifications

References 

Johnny Reid albums
2009 Christmas albums
Christmas albums by Canadian artists
Country Christmas albums